MetroLink is a proposed metro line for the city of Dublin. It was first recommended in the then Irish Government's 2005 Transport 21 transport plan.

The sole line is proposed to run from Estuary on Dublin's northside to Charlemont on the south of the city, with stops including  Dublin Airport, O'Connell Street and St. Stephen's Green. The proposed route consists of mainly uncovered sub-surface track in the Swords area, a tunnel under Dublin Airport, further uncovered sub-surface track until the M50, with a deep bore tunnel running from Northwood to Charlemont.

While, as of March 2018, the line was planned to begin operation in 2027, as of September 2021, government representatives indicated that this target "was never likely to be achievable" with several reports indicating that the project would "not be completed until at least 2032".

History

Initial proposals

The original idea for the two Metro lines in Dublin can be attributed to the November 2001 "Platform for Change" report by the Dublin Transportation Office (now part of the National Transport Authority). The purpose of the report was to come up with an integrated transportation strategy for the greater Dublin region. In its report, the DTO outlined plans for three Metro lines. The first was a north–south line which would run from Swords to Shanganagh via Dublin Airport, Finglas, Broadstone, the city centre, Ranelagh, Sandyford and Cherrywood. The second would link Tallaght West to Tallaght and then continue through the south-western suburbs of Dublin to the city centre. The third line would run in an orbital pattern, with a spur off the Swords-Shanganagh line at Finglas and then continue via Blanchardstown and Clondalkin to Tallaght, where it would connect with the other line.

Dublin Airport carried over 21 million passengers in 2006. This figure was projected to grow rapidly (as it did to 27.9 million by 2016). As a result, Transport Infrastructure Ireland identified a medium-capacity public-transport link to Dublin Airport as one of the most important gaps in the Dublin rail network.  Two options were seen as a solution to the problem:
 A spur off the existing DART line to Dublin Airport, as proposed by Iarnród Éireann.
 A metro system, running from Swords through Dublin Airport and on to the city centre, in line with the National Transport Authority's suggestions.

The metro option emerged as the preferred option, as it provided both an airport link and a commuter link.  It was described by Transport Infrastructure Ireland as "an important commuter link for the communities and institutions of North Dublin City and County". Metro North (from Swords to St. Stephen's Green) and Metro West were adopted as government policy with the launch of the Transport 21 programme in 2005.

Three potential routes for the then called Metro North were published by the Railway Procurement Agency in February 2006. The first route option went through Finglas and made use of the former Broadstone railway alignment. The second route option went  through Ballymun and was eventually adopted as the final route. The third route option went through Whitehall. After public consultation, the RPA announced in October 2006 that they had selected a routing known as the 'East/Central Combined Route'. that ran through Ballymun. A slightly updated route, with changes in proposed station names, some modifications to station locations, and details of proposed overground and underground routes through Swords was released by the RPA in March 2008.

On 22 March 2007, Transport Infrastructure Ireland began the procurement process for Metro North. In October 2007 it announced that it had a shortlist of four consortia interested in building Metro North. Draft Environmental Impact Statements were published in early 2008.

On 17 September 2008, the RPA applied for a railway order to An Bord Pleanála. Oral hearings were heard during 2009 and 2010.

On 5 October 2011, Metro North was granted planning permission by An Bord Pleanála.

It was speculated by the media that the Metro North Project would be indefinitely deferred on 12 August 2011 following a review by Leo Varadkar, then Minister for Transport, Tourism and Sport. This was confirmed on 10 November 2011.

In September 2015, it was announced that Metro North was being relaunched, with a revised opening date of 2027.

In September 2021, government representatives indicated that the 2027 target would not be met and "was never likely to be achievable", with some reports projecting that construction would not commence before 2027. While included in the "National Development Plan 2021-2030", the plan included "no completion dates" for the proposed project.

Rebranding to 'MetroLink' and emerging preferred route

On 22 March 2018, the National Transport Authority announced revised plans for the former Metro North railway line, now called 'MetroLink'. Costing an estimated €3 billion, the route extended further south from the original Estuary-St. Stephen's Green route down to Sandyford, subsuming the Luas Green Line tracks from Charlemont down to its final destination in Sandyford. It was planned to begin operations in 2027, and it combines the existing 'Metro North' and 'Metro South' lines together. If completed according to these plans, Luas services on the Green Line would cease between Sandyford and Charlemont, and be replaced by Metro services. This was met with opposition regarding the potential closure of the Green Line for an undetermined amount of time and issues regarding pedestrian and cyclist permeability along the line. As a result, revised plans were published in March 2019, where the Metrolink line would be delivered in two phases, meaning the Green Line would not be upgraded during the first phase. The Green Line Upgrade would happen as a second phase at a later date after Metrolink from Swords to Charlemont was operational. By developing in two phases the closure of the Green Line could be reduced and more time given to upgrading the existing pedestrian crossings to be fully grade separated through the use of underpasses.

A railway order is due to be sought for 'Metrolink' in the third quarter of 2019. A public consultation for the project closed on 21 May 2018.

As of 2018, the revised MetroLink project was proposed to open in 2027. In December 2019, test drilling for boreholes began for the line. Engineering consultant firm SNC-Lavalin was appointed by Transport Infrastructure Ireland in March 2020 as operations advisor for the project. Due to the COVID-19 pandemic in the Republic of Ireland, work was halted, however in November 2020 ground investigation works were carried out in Swords, with the Railway Order reputed to be submitted "in the first half" of 2021. A planning application was submitted in September 2022.

Operations
If opened as planned, MetroLink is due to operate a single line between Charlemont and Swords. All services are proposed to operate from Charlemont to the airport, with only some trains operating the full length of the line from Charlemont to Estuary.

According to an initial planning report, the metro is proposed to operate for 19 hours per day, with services every 3 minutes at peak times. The planning report proposed a journey time to the city centre of 25 minutes from Swords and 20 minutes from Dublin Airport. A single-bore tunnel has been decided upon for the underground section, in order to save on the cost of a twin-bore tunnel.

Cost
Initially, the National Transport Authority projected that the cost of the project would be €3 billion. As of March 2021, the Minister for Public Expenditure and Reform Michael McGrath reportedly "warned that existing budgets may not cover" the full costs of MetroLink and related projects. It was estimated in July 2022 that the transport plan would cost €9.5 billion, with the most extreme figure putting it at €23 billion.

Further potential plans

Metro South
In 2006 Eamon Ryan, then transport spokesperson for the Green Party, called for the underground section of Metro North to be extended south to Beechwood, where it would then surface and provide a direct link to the Luas Green Line. This option would allow passengers to travel from the south of the city to the north, without having to change mode of transport.

When the Luas Green Line was constructed, it was designed to allow metro trains to potentially operate on the line in the future. In the National Transport Authority's Draft Transport Strategy for the Greater Dublin Area 2016–2035, it was proposed that the Metro North tunnel should be extended southwards to meet the Luas Green line in the Ranelagh area. The Luas Green line would be converted to a metro line, with Luas services on the line ending and being replaced by metro services.

In March 2019, the revised plans were released with the intention to upgrade the Green Line after the northern section is operational. As of 2016, it remained part of the transport strategy to upgrade the Green Line to be capable of running metro services, extending the metro to Sandyford and eventually to Bride's Glen.

Metro South West
In 2020, it was reported that the NTA was assessing additional potential metro provision; with a southwest line serving Terenure, Rathfarnham and Knocklyon, or a southeastern line serving University College Dublin.

Former plans

Metro West

Metro West (Irish: Meitreo Thiar) was proposed to run from an intersection with Metro North, just south of the airport at Santry, and from there pass through Blanchardstown, Liffey Valley, and Clondalkin before joining the Luas Red Line to continue towards Tallaght. Planning on the Metro West Project was suspended in September 2011 following a review by Leo Varadkar, then Minister for Transport, Tourism and Sport, as money to construct the new railway would not be available in the foreseeable future.

Two potential routes for Metro West had been published by the Railway Procurement Agency in January 2007. Following discussions and a public consultation process, a preferred route was announced in July 2007. This route started at Tallaght, running through Belgard, Clondalkin, Liffey Valley, Blanchardstown. Stops were also proposed for the National Aquatic Centre and Abbotstown, before continuing in the direction of Sillogue and Harristown. Following Harristown it would link with the proposed Metro North line, for a combined length of 25 km.

Metro West plans, published in 2007, proposed lines which would run overground, with some tunnels and bridges to avoid major road junctions. In addition to the proposed link with Metro North, the line was proposed to interchange with the Luas at Tallaght and Belgard, rail services at Fonthill and Porterstown and Dublin Bus services at a number of other stops.

Route selection
Metro West was proposed to serve the northern parts of Finglas via stops at the N2 and Meakstown. When developing options for Metro West, the Railway Procurement Agency (RPA) considered routes south of the M50, serving Finglas more directly. Ultimately, these routes were not deemed feasible.

On 11 November 2008, the RPA chose their preferred route for Metro West, including indicative stops, depot and Park and Ride locations. The preferred route for Metro West ran from Tallaght to Metro North at Dardistown, via Clondalkin, Liffey Valley and Blanchardstown. The planned route would interchange with (from south to north) the Luas Red Line, Kildare Railway Line, Luas Line F (to Lucan), Maynooth Railway Line and Metro North Line, as well as local bus services.

Planning and funding
An application for a Railway Order to construct Metro West was lodged to An Bord Pleanala in October 2010. However, this application was withdrawn in September 2011, due to the withdrawal of government funding owing to the global financial crisis.

By 2016, Metro West had been excluded from the National Transport Authority's "Transport Strategy For The Greater Dublin Area 2016-2035". As of 2018, Metro West was not due to be considered for government funding until after 2035.

See also
 Rail transport in Ireland
 List of metro systems

References

External links
 
 National Transport Authority (NTA)
 Dublin – Metro North – Railway Order Application Website

Transport in County Dublin
Transport in Swords, Dublin
Rail transport in Ireland
Dublin
Proposed railway lines in the Republic of Ireland
Proposed rapid transit
2027 in rail transport